

Dolomite Peak is a  mountain summit located in the Bow River valley of Banff National Park, in the Canadian Rockies of Alberta, Canada. Its nearest higher peak is Cirque Peak,  to the northwest. Dolomite Peak can be seen from the Icefields Parkway with its distinctive crags and colorful towers that are a mixture of dolomite and limestone. Dolomite is rare in the Rockies and is stronger than limestone.

History

Dolomite Peak was named in 1897 by Charles E. Fay, Norman Collie, and Charles Thompson for its resemblance to the Dolomites of the Italian Alps.  The mountain's name became official in 1924 by the Geographical Names Board of Canada. The first ascent of Dolomite Peak was made in 1930 by J. Monroe Thorington, with Peter Kaufmann (as guide).

Geology

Like other mountains in Banff Park, Dolomite Peak is composed of sedimentary rock laid down during the Precambrian to Jurassic periods. Formed in shallow seas, this sedimentary rock was pushed east and over the top of younger rock during the Laramide orogeny.

Climate

Based on the Köppen climate classification, Dolomite Peak is located in a subarctic climate with cold, snowy winters, and mild summers. The months July through September offer the most favorable weather for viewing and climbing this peak.

Gallery

References

See also
List of mountains of Canada
Geology of Alberta

External links
 Weather forecast: Dolomite Peak
 Parks Canada web site: Banff National Park

Two-thousanders of Alberta
Mountains of Banff National Park
Alberta's Rockies
Canadian Rockies